St. Martin in Passeier is a comune (municipality) in the Passeier Valley in South Tyrol, northern Italian, located about  northwest of Bolzano.

Geography

The municipality of St Martin in Passeier contains the frazioni (subdivisions, mainly villages and hamlets) Saltaus (Saltusio), Quellenhof (Sorgente), Ried (Novale), Kalmtal (Valclava), Christl (Cresta), Flon (Vallone), and Matatz (Montaccio),

St Martin in Passeier borders the following municipalities: Moos in Passeier, Riffian, and St Leonhard in Passeier.

History

Coat-of-arms
The coat of arms is argent and azure party per pale; in the first part is an azure halberd, in the second half an argent wheel, with four rays. The halberd symbolizes the privileges of the free farmers, while the wheel the village laboriousness.

Society

Linguistic distribution
According to the 2011 census, 99.10% of the population speak German, 0.86% Italian and 0.03% Ladin as first language.

Demographic evolution

Tourism
In 2017 it was the venue for the Linuxbierwanderung.

References

External links

 Homepage of the municipality

Municipalities of South Tyrol